The Kaesŏng Youth Stadium(개성청년경기장) is a multi-use stadium in Kaesŏng, North Korea.  It is currently used mostly for football matches. The stadium holds 35,000 spectators and opened in 1988.

See also 
 List of football stadiums in North Korea

References 

Football venues in North Korea
Sports venues in North Korea
Buildings and structures in North Hwanghae Province
Multi-purpose stadiums in North Korea
Sports venues completed in 1988
Buildings and structures in Kaesong
1988 establishments in North Korea